Fred Harinder Singh Sandhu was appointed to the Provincial Court of Manitoba on May 1, 2003.

Judge Sandhu graduated from the University of Manitoba's Faculty of Law in 1979. After his call to the bar, he worked with Legal Aid Manitoba, focusing on criminal law. Judge Sandhu was a certified youth soccer coach and a past member of the board of the Dauphin Friendship Centre.

References
Government of Manitoba news release (accessed August 3, 2007)

Judges in Manitoba
University of Manitoba alumni
Living people
Year of birth missing (living people)